Gründler is a surname. Notable people with the surname include:

Alexander Gründler (born 1993), Austrian footballer 
Beatrice Gründler (born 1964), German Arabist
Hartmut Gründler (1930–1977), German teacher and activist
Matthias Gründler (born 1965), German businessman